Post-amendment to the Tamil Nadu Entertainments Tax Act 1939 on 1 April 1958, Gross jumped to 140 per cent of Net. Commercial Taxes Department disclosed 15.93 crore in entertainment tax revenue for the year.

The following is a list of films produced in the Tamil film industry in India in 1974, in alphabetical order.

1974

References

Films, Tamil
Lists of 1974 films by country or language
1974
1970s Tamil-language films